The men's team recurve archery competition at the 2017 Summer Universiade was held in the National Taiwan Sport University Stadium, Taipei, Taiwan between August 20–24, 2017.

Records 
Prior to the competition, the world and Universiade records were as follows.
 
 216 arrows qualification round

Qualification round

Elimination round

References 

Men's team recurve